Dalet (also spelled Daleth or Daled) is the fourth letter of the Semitic abjads, including Phoenician Dālet 𐤃, Hebrew Dālet , Aramaic Dālath , Syriac  Dālaṯ , and Arabic   (in abjadi order; 8th in modern order). Its sound value is the voiced alveolar plosive.

The letter is based on a glyph of the Proto-Sinaitic script, probably called  dalt "door" (door in Modern Hebrew is  delet), ultimately based on a hieroglyph depicting a door: O31

Phoenician

The Phoenician dālet gave rise to the Greek delta (Δ), Latin D, and the Cyrillic letter Д.

Aramaic

Hebrew
 

Hebrew spelling: 

The letter is dalet in the modern Israeli Hebrew pronunciation (see Tav (letter). Dales is still used by many Ashkenazi Jews and daleth by some Jews of Middle-Eastern background, especially in the Jewish diaspora. In some academic circles, it is called daleth, following the Tiberian Hebrew pronunciation.  It is also called daled. The ד like the English D represents a voiced alveolar stop. Just as in English, there may be subtle varieties of the sound that are created when it is spoken.

Variations
Dalet can receive a dagesh, being one of the six letters that can receive Dagesh Kal (see Gimel).
There are minor variations to this letter's pronunciation, such as
 ד   ( among Teimanim, Mizrachim and some Sephardim;  among some Ashkenazim.) or
 דּ  .
In addition, in modern Hebrew, the combination ד׳ (dalet followed by a geresh) is used when transcribing foreign names to denote .

Significance
In gematria, dalet symbolizes the number four.

The letter dalet, along with the He (and very rarely Gimel) is used to represent the Names of God in Judaism. The letter He is used commonly, and the dalet is rarer. A good example is the keter (crown) of a tallit, which has the blessing for donning the tallit, and has the name of God usually represented by a dalet. A reason for this is that He is used as an abbreviation for HaShem "The Name" and the dalet is used as a non-sacred way of referring to God.

Dalet as a prefix in Aramaic (the language of the Talmud) is a preposition meaning "that", or "which", or also "from" or "of"; since many Talmudic terms have found their way into Hebrew, one can hear dalet as a prefix in many phrases (as in Mitzvah Doraitah; a mitzvah from the Torah.)

In modern Hebrew the frequency of the usage of dalet, out of all the letters, is 2.59%.

Syriac daled/dolath

It is one of six letters that represents two associated sounds (the others are bet, gimel, kaph, pe and taw). The letter is very common in Syriac as it is often attached to the beginning of words as the relative pronoun.

Daled/dolath is always written with a point below it to distinguish it from the letter resh, which is identical apart from having a point above. As a numeral, dalad/dolath stands for the number four. With various systems of dots and dashes, it can also stand for 4,000 and 40,000.

Arabic dāl

The letter is named dāl دَالْ, and is written in several ways depending on its position in the word:

The letter represents a  sound.

Character encodings

See also
 History of the alphabet#Semitic alphabet
 Proto-Sinaitic script

References

External links

Hebrew letters
Phoenician alphabet
Arabic letters